Alexis Caswell Angell (April 26, 1857 – December 24, 1932), frequently known as A. C. Angell, was a United States district judge of the United States District Court for the Eastern District of Michigan.

Education and career

Born on April 26, 1857, in Providence, Rhode Island, Angell received an Artium Baccalaureus degree in 1878 from the University of Michigan, read law in 1879, and received a Bachelor of Laws in 1880 from the University of Michigan Law School. He entered private practice in Detroit, Michigan from 1880 to 1911. He was a Professor of Law at the University of Michigan from 1893 to 1898, lecturing one half of each year.

Federal judicial service

Angell was nominated by President William Howard Taft on February 25, 1911, to a seat on the United States District Court for the Eastern District of Michigan vacated by Judge Henry Harrison Swan. He was confirmed by the United States Senate on March 2, 1911, and received his commission the same day. His service terminated on June 1, 1912, due to his resignation.

Death

Following his resignation from the federal bench, Angell returned to private practice in Detroit from 1912 to 1932. He died on December 24, 1932.

Family

Angell was the son of James Burrill Angell and Sarah Swope Caswell, and was named for his maternal grandfather, Alexis Caswell, later President of Brown University. Angell was 14 when his family moved to Ann Arbor, Michigan when his father was appointed President of the University of Michigan. In 1880, he married Fanny Cary Cooley, daughter of Law Professor Thomas McIntyre Cooley.

Other activities

Angell edited the second edition of Cooley's Torts (1888), the sixth edition of his Constitutional Limitations (1890), and the second edition of his Principles of Constitutional Law (1891).

References

Sources
 
 

1857 births
1932 deaths
Judges of the United States District Court for the Eastern District of Michigan
United States district court judges appointed by William Howard Taft
20th-century American judges
Lawyers from Providence, Rhode Island
University of Michigan Law School alumni
University of Michigan faculty
United States federal judges admitted to the practice of law by reading law